Larbi Benbarek; also Ben Barek or Ben M'barek, ; 16 June 1917 – 16 September 1992) was a Moroccan football player. He represented the France national football team 17 times. He earned the sobriquet of "Black Pearl".

Career
Ben Barek was born on 16 June 1917 in Casablanca, then part of French Morocco. The first African star and the first to bear the nickname of "Black Pearl," Ben Barek blazed a trail to the European, and particularly French and Spanish, leagues for African-born players. He arrived in Marseille, France, at the age of 20 and became an instant favorite with fans for his skills and technical abilities. He is largely remembered as the first successful French African footballer in Europe.
His career was interrupted by the onset of World War II, but he was soon back to his best with Stade Français FC, eventually moving on to Spain with Atlético Madrid, where his international reputation spread. His nickname with the fans in Spain was "The Foot of God". With the help of Benbarek, Atlético won La Liga in 1950 and 1951. He returned to Marseille in 1953 but joined USM Bel-Abbès shortly thereafter, where he ended his playing career. He scored 78 goals in his career. 

One of the finest players ever to represent France, he made 17 appearances for Les Bleus between 1938 and 1954. His comeback in 1954 against Germany in Hanover was curtailed by an injury after half an hour and proved to be the end of his career.

In 17 games he scored 35 goals and made 14 assists and his trainer Adam Miftah was his coach.

Later life
Larbi Ben Barek died in his hometown on 16 September 1992. Six years after his death, he was awarded the FIFA Order of Merit, FIFA's highest honour.

Honours

Club Atlético de Madrid
Spanish League: 1949–50, 1950–51
Copa Eva Duarte: 1951
Recognitions
FIFA Order of Merit: 1998
IFFHS All-time Morocco Men's Dream Team

References
Citations

Bibliography
 

1917 births
1992 deaths
French sportspeople of Moroccan descent
Moroccan footballers
French footballers
France international footballers
Footballers from Casablanca
Olympique de Marseille players
Stade Français (association football) players
Ligue 1 players
La Liga players
Atlético Madrid footballers
Moroccan football managers
Morocco national football team managers
Expatriate footballers in Spain
French expatriate sportspeople in Spain
French expatriate footballers
Wydad AC players
USM Bel Abbès players
Association football midfielders
AS FAR (football) managers
Shilha people
Moroccan Muslims